The Shire of Gordon was a local government area about  north-northwest of Melbourne, the state capital of Victoria, Australia.

History

The Swan Hill Road District, which initially covered most of north-western Victoria, was incorporated on 8 July 1862, and became a shire on 14 August 1871. The Shire of Gordon was severed and incorporated on 26 May 1885, from parts of the East and West Loddon Ridings, and was named after Major General Charles Gordon. Gordon annexed parts of the South West Riding of the Shire of Kerang on 5 October 1977.

On 20 January 1995, the Shire of Gordon was abolished, and along with the Shires of East Loddon and Korong, and parts of the former Rural City of Marong and surrounding districts, was merged into the newly created Shire of Loddon.

Wards

The Shire of Gordon was divided into three ridings, each of which elected three councillors:
 Central Riding
 East Riding
 West Riding

Towns and localities
 Appin South
 Bald Rock
 Barraport
 Boort*
 Canary Island
 Catumnal
 Durham Ox
 Gladfield
 Kow Swamp
 Lake Marmal
 Leaghur
 Loddon Vale
 Mincha
 Minmindie
 Mologa
 Pyramid Hill
 Sylvaterre
 Terrick Terrick
 Yando
 Yarrawalla

* Council seat.

Population

* Estimate in the 1958 Victorian Year Book.

References

External links
 Victorian Places - Gordon Shire

External links

Gordon
1885 establishments in Australia